LVA is the abbreviation of:
 Lake View Academy, a Seventh-Day Adventist boarding school in Bukidnon, Philippines
 Land-vertebrate age, age of a rock formation determined by biochronology
 Las Vegas Academy of the Arts, a public high school in Las Vegas, Nevada
 Library of Virginia, library of the US state of Virginia
 Liberty Veterans Association, association of former crewmen of USS Liberty
 Licensed Victuallers Association, a local member of the UK's Federation of Licensed Victuallers Associations
 Liga Veneto Autonomo, a regional political party in Veneto, Italy
 Live variable analysis, a method of calculating the live variables at each point in a computer program
 London Video Arts (1976–1988), a British non-profit organization to support video arts
 Luchtvaartafdeling (aviation department), original name of the Royal Netherlands Air Force
 lva, ISO 639-3 code for the Makuva language
 LVA, ISO 3166-1 alpha-3 country code for Latvia